Balvin is the surname of the following people:
František Balvín (1915–2003), Czech cross-country skier 
J Balvin (born 1985), Colombian singer, songwriter, rapper and record producer 
Noe Balvin (born 1930), Colombian sports shooter
Ondřej Balvín (born 1992), Czech basketball player